Sarcococca orientalis is a species in the genus Sarcococca in the plant family Buxaceae. It is commonly known as Christmas box or sweet box. It is native to Jiangxi province of south-east China, and forms a small evergreen shrub, preferring positions with some shade. The ovate-lanceolate leaves are cuneate at the base and can reach 9 cm in length. The leaves are longer than the leaves of the commonly cultivated S.confusa and broader than S. hookeriana. The pink-tinged white flowers are inconspicuous but sweetly scented, and appear along the branches in midwinter, their scent most noticeable during mild spells. The small fruits (drupes) are black.

References

Flora of China
orientalis